Morisset Park is a suburb of the City of Lake Macquarie in New South Wales, Australia on a peninsula east of the town of Morisset on the western side of Lake Macquarie.

History 
J.A. Gorrick, an early settler, became the father-in-law of the actor Bert Bailey in 1902. Bailey then purchased Gorrick's land and built an eighteen-room house there, known as The Bluff. In 1934, the property was acquired by the Little Company of Mary, who nursed tuberculosis patients there. In 1947, the Brothers of St John of God acquired the site and ran a special school for boys.

References

External links
 History of Morisset Park (Lake Macquarie City Library)

Suburbs of Lake Macquarie
1878 establishments in Australia